Incarvillea delavayi, the socalled hardy gloxinia or flowering fern, is a species of flowering plant in the family Bignoniaceae, native to western Sichuan and northwest Yunnan provinces of China. The true Gloxinia are members of the Gesneriaceae, while true ferns are flowerless plants which reproduce through spores.

A slugprone perennial with fernlike leaves, it is hardy in USDA zones 5b through 7, and is recommended for borders and rock gardens in part shade to full sun. The original species and a number of cultivars are commercially available, including 'Bees Pink' and 'Snowtop'.

References

Bignoniaceae
Garden plants of Asia
Endemic flora of China
Flora of South-Central China
Plants described in 1891